Jouko Lindbergh (born 25 August 1947) is a Finnish boxer. He competed at the 1968 Summer Olympics and the 1972 Summer Olympics. At the 1968 Summer Olympics, he lost to Michael Carter of Great Britain.

References

1947 births
Living people
Finnish male boxers
Olympic boxers of Finland
Boxers at the 1968 Summer Olympics
Boxers at the 1972 Summer Olympics
Sportspeople from Tampere
Bantamweight boxers